Vym may refer to
 Vym (river), a river in Russia
 vym (software), a mindmap software application